Euphilotes is a genus of butterflies in the family Lycaenidae, which consists of a number of species found in western North America. Some of the species are endangered, such as the Smith's blue, Euphilotes enoptes smithi.

Species
Listed alphabetically:
 Euphilotes ancilla (Barnes & McDunnough, 1918) – Rocky Mountain dotted blue
 Euphilotes battoides (Behr, 1867) – Square-spotted blue or buckwheat blue
 Euphilotes baueri (Shields, 1975) – Bauer's dotted-blue
 Euphilotes bernardino (Barnes & McDunnough, 1916) – Bernardino blue or Bernardino dotted-blue
 Euphilotes centralis (Barnes & McDunnough, 1917)
 Euphilotes columbiae (Matoni, 1954) Columbian blue
 Euphilotes ellisi (Shields, 1975) – Ellis dotted-blue
 Euphilotes enoptes (Boisduval, 1852) – Dotted blue
 Euphilotes glaucon (Edwards, 1871) Glaucon blue or summit blue
 Ephilotes heracleoides (Kohler & Warren, 2021)  Pumice blue
 Euphilotes intermedia (Barnes & McDunnough, 1917) – intermediate dotted-blue INVALID
 Euphilotes mojave (Watson & Comstock, 1920) – Mojave dotted-blue
 Euphilotes pallescens (Tilden & Downey, 1955) – Pale blue, pallid dotted-blue or pallid blue
 Euphilotes rita (Barnes & McDunnough, 1916) – Rita blue or desert buckwheat blue
 Euphilotes spaldingi (Barnes & McDunnough, 1917) – Colorado-Plateau blue

See also
Carbonera Creek
Maritime coast range ponderosa pine forest

References

External links

Taxonomy tree for genus Euphilotes
Euphilotes, Butterflies and Moths of North America

 
Butterflies of North America
Lycaenidae genera